Parliamentary elections were held in Egypt on 23 March 1925. The elections saw the Wafd Party lose over half of its seats.

Results

References

Egypt
Elections in Egypt
1925 in Egypt
March 1925 events
Election and referendum articles with incomplete results